Amálie Hilgertová (born 4 September 1997) is a Czech slalom canoeist who has competed at the international level since 2013.

She won two medals at the ICF Canoe Slalom World Championships with a silver in 2019 (K1 team) and a bronze in 2017 (Extreme K1). She also won a gold and a bronze medal in the K1 event at the European Championships.

Family
She comes from a canoeing family. Her father is Ivan Hilgert, her mother is Marcela Hilgertová. Double Olympic champion Štěpánka Hilgertová is her aunt. Her uncle is Luboš Hilgert sr. and her cousin is Luboš Hilgert jr.

World Cup individual podiums

References

External links

Czech female canoeists
Living people
1997 births
Canoeists at the 2014 Summer Youth Olympics
Medalists at the ICF Canoe Slalom World Championships
People from Brandýs nad Labem-Stará Boleslav
Sportspeople from the Central Bohemian Region